Agulhas (needles in the Portuguese language —  or ) may refer to:
 Cape Agulhas, the southernmost point of Africa
 L'Agulhas, a town near the Cape
 Cape Agulhas Lighthouse, located at the Cape
 Cape Agulhas Local Municipality, the municipality governing the area around Bredasdorp, including the Cape
 Agulhas National Park, a national park protecting areas around Cape Agulhas
 The Agulhas Bank, an area of ocean south of the Cape
 The Agulhas Current, an ocean current off the east coast of South Africa
 South African research ships: :
S. A. Agulhas
S. A. Agulhas II